Qinghe railway station is a railway station in Beijing. The old station began its construction in 1905 and opened in 1906. The station closed on October 31, 2016, to be rebuilt into a new high-speed railway station on the Beijing-Baotou Passenger-Dedicated Line opened on December 30, 2019.

It has four island platforms and eight railway lines, including two main lines (Screen doors are set on the main line platforms). The station together with Beijing North railway station is the terminal of Beijing–Zhangjiakou intercity railway, which is the vital supporting infrastructure of 2022 Winter Olympics.

Design 
AREP collaborated with China Railway Engineering Consulting Group designed this station in 2016.  The overall design philosophy is to blend the ancient and the modern, and the sea refuses no rivers. The curved roof and overhang eave represent the ancient style. The angled bents supporting frame and the simple and powerful geometric shape are full of modern technology.

Many cultural elements are used in the station. On the roof, seven west-to-east sloping ridges are like seven ski runs. Equipment rooms in the waiting hall are decorated with mural and relievo reflecting the geographical and cultural features of Beijing.

Structure 

The station has total five floors, three overground and two underground.

B1 floor is the transfer floor, on which are the railway exit 1-2 and underground railway entrance, railway integrated service center 1, railway automatic ticketing area 1-2, the Suburban Railway entrance and exit, the subway hall (subway entrance, exit and service center), parking area, passageway to East and West Plaza.

As a feature of this station, the security checks of different transportations are mutual recognized. Passengers do not need to take repetitive security checks when transfer among subway, railway and suburban railway.

F1 (Ground Floor) is the railway platform floor with east and west plazas. East Plaza links to Anningzhuang 2nd West Tiao Road and north public transportation hubs (PTH). West Plaza has railway entrance 1, railway automatic ticketing area 3-4, west PTH, taxi stand, and links to Shangdi East Road.

F2 is the railway waiting hall floor with north and south elevated drop-off platforms. In the waiting hall, there are check-in gate 1-8A/B, 12306 service center, and four characteristic waiting areas (military waiting area, children playing area, business travel leisure area, and multi-function service area). On the north drop-off platform, there are drop-off area, railway entrance 3, railway integrated service center 3, railway automatic ticketing area 6, and business waiting room 2, and links to Anningzhuang North Road. On the south drop-off platform, there are drop-off area, railway entrance 2, railway integrated service center 2, railway automatic ticketing area 5, business waiting room 1, and links to G7.

F3 is the shopping floor. Some specialties shops and restaurants are on F3.

Beijing Subway 

An infill station on Line 13 of Beijing Subway opened on December 30, 2019. The station for Line 13 is at-grade.

The station on Changping line of Beijing Subway opened on December 31, 2021. The station for Changping line is underground.

The branch line of the north extension of Line 19 will stop there as well. The station for Line 19 (branch) is underground.

See also 
 Qinghe Subdistrict, Beijing
 Beijing North railway station

References

Railway stations in Haidian District
Railway stations in China opened in 1909